Borboryctis is a genus of moths in the family Gracillariidae.

Etymology
The genus name is derived from the Greek borbos (meaning fleshy, swollen) and oryctis (digger, miner).

Species
Borboryctis euryae Kumata & Kuroko, 1988
Borboryctis triplaca (Meyrick, 1908)

References

External links
Global Taxonomic Database of Gracillariidae (Lepidoptera)

Acrocercopinae
Gracillarioidea genera